Ladislav Zgusta (20 March 1924 in Libochovice – 27 April 2007 in Urbana, Illinois) was a Czech-American historical linguist and lexicographer, who wrote one of the first textbooks on lexicography. He was a professor of linguistics and classics at the University of Illinois at Urbana-Champaign. Dutch lexicographer Piet van Sterkenburg referred to Zgusta as "the twentieth-century godfather of lexicography". He was elected a Fellow of the American Academy of Arts and Sciences in 1992, and in the same year awarded the Gold Medal of the Czech Academy of Sciences for his work in Humanities.

Bibliography 
 Die Personennamen griechischer Städte der nördlichen Schwarzmeerküste: Die ethnischen Verhältnisse, namentlich das Verhältnis der Skythen und Sarmaten, im Lichte der Namenforschung (Československá akademie ved. Monografie orientálního ústavu 16 ). Praha : Nakladatelstvi československé Akademie Ved 1955.
 Kleinasiatische Personennamen (Československá akademie ved. Monografie orientálního ústavu 19). Prag: Verlag der Tschechoslowakischen Akademie der Wissenschaften 1964
 Anatolische Personennamensippen. Teil 1: Text. Teil 2: Beilagen (Dissertationes Orientales 2). Prag: Academia 1964.
 Neue Beiträge zur kleinasiatischen Anthroponymie (Dissertationes orientales 24). Prag: Academia 1970.
 Manual of lexicography (Janua Linguarum. Series maior 39). Prague: Academia / The Hague, Paris: Mouton 1971 (in cooperation with V. Cerny i.a.).
 Kleinasiatische Ortsnamen (Beiträge zur Namenforschung, Beih. 21). Heidelberg: Carl Winter 1984 .
 The old Ossetic inscription from the river Zelencuk (Veröffentlichungen der Iranischen Kommission = Sitzungsberichte der österreichischen Akademie der Wissenschaften. Philosophisch-historische Klasse 486). Wien : Verlag der Österreichischen Akademie der Wissenschaften 1987 
 Lexicography today: an annotated bibliography of the theory of lexicography (Lexicographica. Series maior 18). Tübingen: Niemeyer 1988  (with the assistance of Donna M. T. Cr. Farina).
 History, Languages and Lexicographers (Lexicographica. Series maior 41). Tübingen: Niemeyer 1992 .
  Lexicography Then and Now. Selected Essays. (Lexicographica. Series maior 129. Edited by Fredric S.F. Dolezal and Thomas B.I. Creamer). Tübingen: Max Niemeyer Verlag 2006.

Editor 
 Manual of Lexicography. 1971 .

References

External links
 Biography in Czech
 In Memoriam by  Hans Henrich Hock on LINGUIST List

Historical linguists
Czech lexicographers
1924 births
2007 deaths
Fellows of the American Academy of Arts and Sciences
Czechoslovak emigrants to the United States
20th-century lexicographers
Linguists from the United States